Calochortus tiburonensis, the Tiburon Mariposa lily, is a rare member of the genus Calochortus in the family Liliaceae. It is endemic to Marin County, California, where it is known only from one population on Ring Mountain east of Mill Valley.

Description
Calochortus tiburonensis is a perennial growing from a bulb to 10–60 cm in height with a single leaf. It produces anywhere from 2 to 7 erect flowers annually on a branching stem. The ciliate, light yellow-green petals are streaked with purplish-brown. When mature, ovaries form a capsule full of small, dark brown seeds.

Conservation
The plant was federally listed as a threatened species in 1995. It is considered threatened due to loss of surrounding habitat to recreational activities, to competition from invasive plant species, to its proximity to a dense population center, and to its confinement to a single population of plants. The population grows on land owned by the Marin County Open Space District, an area previously owned and preserved by The Nature Conservancy. It was first brought to the attention of science in 1971, and was described to science in 1973. It is protected along with a number of other rare serpentine soils endemic plants that grow on and around Ring Mountain.

The plant has probably always been rare and limited to its current distribution on the Ring Mountain outcrop. A 1991 estimate placed the total population size at about 40,000 individuals. While the land is protected, the flora upon it are still vulnerable to events such as wildfires or drought, and to damage from off-leash dogs, hikers, cyclists, vandals, and wildflower collectors.

References

 Calochortus tiburonensis. USDA, NRCS. 2006. The PLANTS Database, Version 3.5. Data compiled from various sources by Mark W. Skinner. National Plant Data Center, Baton Rouge, LA 70874-4490 USA.

External links

 Calochortus tiburonensis — Calphotos Photo gallery, University of California @ Berkeley

tiburonensis
Endemic flora of California
Endemic flora of the San Francisco Bay Area
Natural history of the California chaparral and woodlands
Natural history of Marin County, California
Tiburon, California
Plants described in 1973
Critically endangered flora of California